The 1992-93 Four Hills Tournament took place at the four traditional venues of Oberstdorf, Garmisch-Partenkirchen, Innsbruck and Bischofshofen, located in Germany and Austria, between 30 December 1992 and 6 January 1993.

Results

Overall

References

External links 
  

Four Hills Tournament
1992 in ski jumping
1993 in ski jumping
1992 in German sport
1993 in German sport
1993 in Austrian sport